Guardian and ward may refer to:
Legal guardian
Ward (law)